Kastania Cave at Vatika region, prefecture of Lakonia. About 11 kilometers from Neapoli Voion.

Further info at official tourist municipality page and local tourist guide.

Show caves in Greece